Teragra vogti is a moth in the family Cossidae. It is found in South Africa.

The wingspan is about 35 mm. The forewings are very pale greyish with a dark brown subbasal area much broken up and extending below the cell to the middle of the inner margin and likewise more or less to the costa. There is a broad, indefinite, dark brown postmedian stripe which is very slightly oblique. The whole wing has a rather mottled appearance. The hindwings are pale grey, somewhat finely irrorated with darker brown.

References

Natural History Museum Lepidoptera generic names catalog

Endemic moths of South Africa
Metarbelinae
Moths described in 1927